James Baillie Nichol (7 April 1903 – 24 November 1954) was a Scottish footballer. He played professionally for Gillingham and Portsmouth between 1925 and 1938. In total he made over 400 appearances in the Football League.

References

1903 births
1954 deaths
Association football wing halves
Scottish footballers
Gillingham F.C. players
Portsmouth F.C. players
English Football League players
FA Cup Final players